Mohamed Kheddis (29 February 1952 – 26 August 2008) was an Algerian international footballer. He played as a central defender. He represented Algeria in the 1980 Summer Olympics and participated in the qualification process for the 1982 FIFA World Cup. He died from a heart attack. His son Sid Ahmed Kheddis currently plays for NA Hussein Dey.

International career
In January 1980, Kheddis was a member of the Algerian National Team at the 1980 Africa Cup of Nations in Nigeria. He started all five of Algeria's games at the tournament, helping the team reach the final for the first time in the country's history. However, they lost the final 3–0 to hosts Nigeria.

Later that year, Kheddis was again a member of the Algerian National Team, this time at the 1980 Summer Olympics in Moscow, Soviet Union. Kheddis played in 3 of Algeria's 4 matches at the tournament.

Honours
Club :
 Algerian Professional League :
 Runner-up:
 1972–1973; 1975–1976; 1981–1982
Algerian Cup: 
 Winner : 
 1978–1979
 
 Runner-up : 
 1976–1977; 1981–1982
African Cup Winners' Cup;
 Runner-up 1978
International :

Algeria :
Africa Cup of Nations :
 Runner-up 1980
Olympic Games :
 Quarter-Final 1980

References

1952 births
2008 deaths
Algerian footballers
Algeria international footballers
Olympic footballers of Algeria
Footballers at the 1980 Summer Olympics
NA Hussein Dey players
Footballers from Algiers
African Games competitors for Algeria
Footballers at the 1973 All-Africa Games
1980 African Cup of Nations players
Association football central defenders
21st-century Algerian people